Hermania is the first EP by Herman's Hermits, released in 1965 in the United Kingdom by EMI/Columbia (catalogue number SEG 8440). The entire contents were included on the US version of the band's debut album Herman's Hermits.

Track listing 
Side 1
"Sea Cruise" (Huey "Piano" Smith, Johnny Vincent)
"Mother-in-Law" (Allen Toussaint)

Side 2
"I Understand (Just How You Feel)" (Pat Best)
"Thinkin' of You" (Richard Pearson, John Wright)

External links 
plutomusic.com

Herman's Hermits albums
1965 debut EPs
EMI Records EPs